Eudorella is a genera of marine hooded shrimp in the family Leuconidae. Their skeletons are chitinous.

Species 
Placed by the WoRMS.

 Eudorella abyssi Sars, 1887
 Eudorella acuticaudata Akiyama & Gamo, 2012
 Eudorella aequiremis Hansen, 1920
 Eudorella arctica Hansen, 1920
 Eudorella bacescui Petrescu, 1991
 Eudorella bathyalis Vassilenko & Tzareva, 2004
 Eudorella bathyhwanghaensis Akiyama & Gamo, 2012
 Eudorella breviflagella Akiyama & Gamo, 2012
 Eudorella dentata Lomakina, 1955
 Eudorella divae Muhlenhardt-Siegel, 2005
 Eudorella emarginata (Krøyer, 1846)
 Eudorella fallax Zimmer, 1909
 Eudorella flokkeri Mühlenhardt-Siegel, 2011
 Eudorella fusafusa Akiyama & Gamo, 2012
 Eudorella gottliebi Băcescu, 1961
 Eudorella gracilior Zimmer, 1907
 Eudorella gracilis Sars, 1871
 Eudorella groenlandica Zimmer, 1926
 Eudorella haradai Akiyama & Gamo, 2012
 Eudorella hirsuta (Sars, 1869)
 Eudorella hispida Sars, 1871
 Eudorella hurleyi Jones, 1963
 Eudorella hwanghaensis Hong & Park, 1999
 Eudorella intermedia Hansen, 1920
 Eudorella menziesi Petrescu, 1991
 Eudorella minor Lomakina, 1952
 Eudorella monodon Calman, 1912
 Eudorella nana Sars, 1879
 Eudorella ohtai Akiyama & Gamo, 2012
 Eudorella orientalis Akiyama & Gamo, 2012
 Eudorella pacifica Hart, 1930
 Eudorella parahirsuta Akiyama & Gamo, 2012
 Eudorella parvula Hansen, 1920
 Eudorella pusilla Sars, 1871
 Eudorella redacticruris Watling & McCann, 1996
 Eudorella rochfordi Hale, 1945
 Eudorella similis Calman, 1907
 Eudorella sordida Zimmer, 1907
 Eudorella spitzbergensis Zimmer, 1926
 Eudorella splendida Zimmer, 1902
 Eudorella suluensis Akiyama & Gamo, 2012
 Eudorella tridentata Hart, 1930
 Eudorella truncatula (Bate, 1856)

References 

Cumacea
Malacostraca genera